Iqraam Rayners (born 19 December 1995) is a South African soccer player who plays as a forward for South African Premier Division side Stellenbosch.

Career
Rayners played youth football with Kenpark United before joining Santos at under-17 level. He made his debut for them during the 2014–15 season. He played for Stellenbosch before joining SuperSport United in summer 2020 after signing a pre-contract agreement in January 2020.Rayners returned to Stellenbosch FC in 2023 and wears the number nine jersey.

References

Living people
1995 births
South African soccer players
Association football forwards
Santos F.C. (South Africa) players
Stellenbosch F.C. players
SuperSport United F.C. players
South African Premier Division players
National First Division players